Needmore is a ghost town in Tallahatchie County, Mississippi, United States.

The settlement had a post office, school, church and cemetery.  The Needmore Cemetery is all that remains.

References

Former populated places in Tallahatchie County, Mississippi
Former populated places in Mississippi